Most of the Remixes is the shortened title of a remix compilation album by Belgian electronic music group Soulwax. It was released on 22 October 2007, and features a collection of remixes made by Soulwax for other artists. The album's full title contains 552 characters of text and 103 words.

Background
The remix album is noted for having a 552-character album title, about 100 characters more than the Fiona Apple album When the Pawn..., which previously held the record for being the longest title for a major label album. This was later surpassed by the 2008 Chumbawamba album The Boy Bands Have Won..., with its full title containing 865 characters of text.

Track listing

Disc one
 Gossip, "Standing in the Way of Control" (Soulwax nite version) – 6:56
 Producers: Guy Picciotto, Ryan Hadlock
 Writers: Gossip
 LCD Soundsystem, "Daft Punk Is Playing at My House" (Soulwax Shibuya re-remix) – 7:09
 Producer: The DFA
 Writer: James Murphy
 Human Resource vs. 808 State, "Dominator" (Soulwax edit) – 4:03
 Writers: 808 State
 Producers, writers: 80 AUM, Johan van Beek, Robert Mahu
 Klaxons, "Gravity's Rainbow" (Soulwax remix) – 6:24
 Producer: James Ford
 Writers: Klaxons
 DJ Shadow, "Six Days" (Soulwax remix) – 5:14
 Producer: DJ Shadow
 Writers: B. Farrell, D. Olivieri, J. Davis
 Justice, "Phantom Pt. II" (Soulwax remix) – 7:27
 Writers, producers: Gaspard Auge, Xavier de Rosnay
 Kylie Minogue, "Can't Get You Out of My Head" (Soulwax KYLUSS remix) – 4:20
 Writers, producers – Cathy Dennis, Rob Davis
 Gorillaz, "DARE" (Soulwax remix) – 5:45
 Producers: Danger Mouse, Gorillaz, James Dring, Jason Cox
 Writers: Gorillaz
 Robbie Williams, "Lovelight" (Soulwax Ravelight dub) – 6:28
 Producer: Mark Ronson
 Writer: Lewis Taylor
 Arthur Argent, "Hold Your Head Up" (Soulwhacked mix) – 5:46
 Producer: Arthur Baker
 Writers: White, Argent
 Lords of Acid,  "I Sit on Acid" (Soulwax remix) – 3:01
 Producer – Jachri Praha
 Writers: Inger, Van Oekel, Van Lierop, Khan
 Daft Punk, "Robot Rock" (Soulwax remix) – 6:31
 Producers: Cedric Hervet, Daft Punk, Gildas Loaec
 Writers: Guy-Manuel de Homem-Christo, Thomas Bangalter, Kae Williams
 Sugababes, "Round Round" (Soulwax remix) – 4:14
 Producers: Jonathan Quarmby, Kevin Bacon
 Additional production: Jeremy Wheatley
 Original production: Brian Higgins, Tim Powell
  Writers: Higgins, Stecher, Plfueger, Range, Buchanan, Cowling, Cooper, Buena, Coler, Spadavecchia, Hofmann, Powell
 Muse, "Muscle Museum" (Soulwax remix) – 3:47
 Producers: Muse, Paul Reeve
 Writers: Matthew Bellamy

Disc two
There is a hidden track before the start of track 1 of disc 2; the lost Einstürzende Neubauten remix mentioned in the title. The track also appears as track 20 on the Japanese release.

 0.   Einstürzende Neubauten, "Stella Maris (Soulwax Remix)" – 5:35

 The following is a mix by 2 Many DJ's.
 LCD Soundsystem, "Daft Punk Is Playing at My House" (Soulwax Shibuya re-remix) – 3:20
 Producer: The DFA
 Writer: James Murphy
 Gossip, "Standing in the Way of Control" (Soulwax nite version) – 3:36
 Producers: Guy Picciotto, Ryan Hadlock
 Writers: Gossip
 Arthur Argent, "Hold Your Head Up" (Soulwhacked mix) – 3:34
 Producer: Arthur Baker
 Writers: White, Argent
 Daft Punk, "Robot Rock" (Soulwax remix) – 1:38
 Producers: Cedric Hervet, Daft Punk, Gildas Loaec
 Writers: Guy-Manuel de Homem-Christo, Thomas Bangalter, Kae Williams
 Human Resource vs. 808 State, "Dominator" (Soulwax remix) – 2:37
 Writer: 808 State
 Writers, producers: 80 AUM, Johan van Beek, Robert Mahu
 Robbie Williams, "Lovelight" (Soulwax Ravelight dub) – 3:30
 Producer: Mark Ronson
 Writer: Lewis Taylor
 Kylie Minogue, "Can't Get You Out of My Head" (Soulwax KYLUSS remix) – 2:00
 Writers, producers: Cathy Dennis, Rob Davis
 West Phillips, "(I'm Just A Sucker) For a Pretty Face" (Soulwax remix) – 1:31
 Producers: Larry Williams, West Phillips
 Writer: West Phillips
 Justice, "Phantom Pt. II" (Soulwax remix) – 3:15
 Writers, producers: Gaspard Auge, Xavier de Rosnay
 Sugababes, "Round Round" (Soulwax remix) – 2:49
 Producers – Jonathan Quarmby, Kevin Bacon
 Additional production: Jeremy Wheatley
 Original production: Brian Higgins, Tim Powell
 Writers: Higgins, Stecher, Plfueger, Range, Buchanan, Cowling, Cooper, Buena, Coler, Spadavecchia, Hofmann, Powell
 Tiga, "Move My Body" (original version) – 2:28
 Producers: Soulwax, Tiga
 Writers: Tiga Sontag
 Playgroup, "Make It Happen" (Soulwax remix) – 1:36
 Producer: Trevor Jackson
 Writers: DeConnick, Jackson
 Klaxons, "Gravity's Rainbow" (Soulwax remix) – 3:12
 Producer: James Ford
 Writers: Klaxons
 Felix da Housecat, "Rocket Ride" (Soulwax Rock It Right remix) – 3:07
 Writers, producer: Felix da Housecat, GoodandEvil, Tommie Sunshine
 Ladytron, "Seventeen" (Soulwax remix) – 2:14
 Producer: Daniel Hunt (Additional production by Mickey Petralia)
 Writers: Ladytron
 Gorillaz, "DARE" (Soulwax remix) – 1:42
 Producers: Danger Mouse, Gorillaz, James Dring, Jason Cox
 Writers: Gorillaz
 Hot Chip, "Ready for the Floor" (Soulwax dub) – 5:36
 Producer, writer: Hot Chip
 Lords of Acid, "I Sit on Acid" (Soulwax remix) – 1:29
Producer – Jachri Praha
Writers: Inger, Van Oekel, Van Lierop, Khan
 DJ Shadow, "Six Days" (Soulwax remix) – 4:02
 Producer – DJ Shadow
 Writers: B. Farrell, D. Olivieri, J. Davis

Charts

Weekly charts

Year-end charts

Notes and references
Notes

References

External links

Most of the Remixes... review at AltNation.com

Soulwax albums
2007 remix albums
Parlophone remix albums